Socolar is a free searchable database of open access journals, and repositories hosted by the China Educational Publications Import and Export Corporation (CEPIEC), one of the largest state-owned companies that was established in 1987 to meet the demands of foreign academic publications from universities and colleges in China. It links to more than 11,739 journals and more than 1048 repositories with about 23,795,416 articles in total in many languages.

References

External links
 Socolar
 China Educational Publications Import and Export Corporation Ltd.

See also
 List of academic databases and search engines

Bibliographic databases and indexes